Josh Gibson is a public artwork by sculptor Omri Amrany, located at the Nationals Park in Washington, D.C., United States.

Description
The statue depicts Negro leagues catcher and Baseball Hall of Fame member Josh Gibson batting.

Artist
Omri Amrany is an Israeli-American best known as a sculptor.

Information
The sculpture was commissioned by The D.C. Commission for The Arts & Humanities and was unveiled at Nationals Park, on April 8, 2009, by the Gibson Family.

See also
Artworks commemorating African Americans in Washington, D.C.

References

External links
Nats320 -- A Washington Nationals Blog: Nationals Park Artworks Unveiled
Three Sculptures Unveiled at Nationals Park

2009 sculptures
Bronze sculptures in Washington, D.C.
Outdoor sculptures in Washington, D.C.
Sculptures of African Americans
Sculptures of men in Washington, D.C.
Statues of sportspeople
Statues in Washington, D.C.